Robi may refer to:

People

Given name
Robi Botos, Hungarian-Canadian jazz pianist
Robi Das, Indian footballer
Robi Domingo (born 1989), Filipino VJ, actor, dancer and host
Robi Ghosh (1931–1997), Indian actor and comedian who worked in Bengali cinema
Robi Jakovljević (born 1993), Slovenian footballer
Robi Levkovich (born 1988), Israeli footballer
Röbi Rapp (1930–2018), Swiss actor influential in the European LGBT social movement
Robi Reed, American casting director and producer
Robi Saarma (born 2001), Estonian footballer

Surname
Alys Robi (1923–2011), Canadian singer, stage name of Alice Robitaille
Mir Mostaque Ahmed Robi (born 1954), Bangladesh politician and MP
Robiul Islam Robi (born 1990), Bangladeshi cricketer

Business and economy
Robi (company), mobile network operator in Bangladesh

Others
 robi (binary prefix), a binary unit prefix
 Meta Robi, one of the woredas in the Oromia Region of Ethiopia
 RobiHachi, Japanese anime television series

See also
Robbie
Robin (disambiguation)